Penns Valley Area High School is a small, rural, public school located in Centre County, Pennsylvania. In 2015, enrollment was 672 pupils in 7th through 12th grades. The school employed 50 teachers in 2015. Penns Valley Area High School is the sole junior high school or senior high school operated by the Penns Valley Area School District.

Special education services are provided by district employees and the Central Intermediate Unit CIU10. Occupational training and adult education in various vocational and technical fields are provided by the district and the Central Pennsylvania Institute of Science and Technology.

Extracurriculars
Penns Valley Area School District offers a wide variety of clubs and activities and an extensive sports program.

Sports
The district funds:
Varsity

Boys
 Baseball - AA
 Basketball - AA
 Cross Country - A
 Football  and JV team - AA
 Golf - AA
 Soccer - A
 Track and Field - AA
 Wrestling - AA

Girls
Basketball - AA
Cross Country - A
Golf - AA
Soccer (Fall) - A
Softball - AA
Track and Field - AA
Volleyball - A

Junior High Sports

Boys
Basketball
Football
Soccer
Track and Field
Wrestling	

Girls
Basketball
Soccer (fall)
Softball
Track and Field

According to PIAA directory July 2015

References

Schools in Centre County, Pennsylvania
Public high schools in Pennsylvania